Gianpaolo Spagnulo (born 26 September 1964) is an Italian retired footballer who last played for Taranto 1927 in his home country.

Career

Spagnulo started his senior career with S.S.D. Città di Brindisi. In 1992, he signed for Genoa C.F.C. in the Italian Serie A, where he made twenty-four league appearances and scored zero goals. After that, he played for A.C. Pisa 1909, Delfino Pescara 1936, A.C. Perugia Calcio, Esporte Clube Vitória, S.S.D. Casarano Calcio, and Taranto 1927.

References

External links 
 Taranto: Once upon a time ... Gianpaolo Spagnulo 
 Spagnulo, 'Today football is no longer what it once was' 
 Interview with ex footballer Gianpaolo Spagnulo 
 Gianpaolo Spagnulo, the jaguar is back 
 Amarcord, Gianpaolo Spagnulo former goalkeeper of Genoa, Pisa, Perugia and Pescara

1964 births
Living people
Italian footballers
Genoa C.F.C. players
Association football goalkeepers